Canton of Montfaucon-Montigné is a former canton of France, located in the Maine-et-Loire département, in the Pays de la Loire région. It had 26,435 inhabitants (2012). It was disbanded following the French canton reorganisation which came into effect in March 2015. It consisted of 11 communes, which joined the new canton of Saint-Macaire-en-Mauges in 2015.

The canton comprised the following communes:

 Montfaucon-Montigné
 Le Longeron
 La Renaudière
 La Romagne
 Roussay
 Saint-André-de-la-Marche
 Saint-Crespin-sur-Moine
 Saint-Germain-sur-Moine
 Saint-Macaire-en-Mauges
 Tillières
 Torfou

See also 
 Arrondissement of Cholet
 Cantons of the Maine-et-Loire department
 Communes of the Maine-et-Loire department

References

Montfaucon-Montigne
2015 disestablishments in France
States and territories disestablished in 2015